This is a list of Zimbabwean writers.

 N. H. Brettell (1908–1991), poet
 NoViolet Bulawayo (1981– ), novelist 
 Patrick Chakaipa (1932–2003), novelist 
 Charles C Singende (1943–2007), poet and Shona Literature Bureau, contributor and compiler of Nhetembo 1977 
 L. Washington Chaparadza (1929–1964), Shona writer
 Paul Chidyausiku (1929– ), preacher and writer 
 Bernard Chidzero (1927–2002), economist and novelist
 Samuel Chimsoro (1949–2016), novelist and poet
 Shimmer Chinodya (1957– ), poet, short story writer, novelist, and textbook writer
 Edmund Chipamaunga (1938–2019), novelist
 Herbert Chitepo (1923–1975), novelist
 Raymond Choto (1962– ), journalist and novelist
 A. S. Cripps (1869–1952), priest, short story writer and poet
 Tsitsi Dangarembga (1959– ), novelist
 John Eppel (1947– ), novelist, poet and short story writer
 Petina Gappah (1971– ), short-story writer and novelist
 Chenjerai Hove (1956– ), novelist, poet, critic and editor
 Wilson Katiyo (1947–2003), novelist
 Philios Mtshane Khumalo (1925– ), Shona writer
 Giles Kuimba (1936– ), novelist 
 Doris Lessing (1919–2013), born in Persia (now Iran), Nobel literature prize-winner, critic, novelist and short story writer
Steve Linde (1960– ), newspaperman 
 Ignatius Mabasa (1971– ), poet and novelist
 Nevanji Madanhire (1961– ), novelist and editor of the Zimbabwe Standard
 Wiseman Magwa (1962– ), playwright
 Barbara Makhalisa (1949– ), novelist and short story writer
 Nozipo Maraire (1966– ), doctor and writer
 John Marangwanda (1923– ), Shona novelist 
 Dambudzo Marechera (1952–1987), novelist
 Edmund Masundire (1966– ), novelist
 Timothy O. McLoughlin (1937– ), novelist, poet and editor
 Cont Mhlanga, playwright, actor and theatre director
 S. O. Mlilo (1924–1995), Ndebele novelist
 Aaron Chiwundura Moyo (1959– ), novelist and playwright
 Charles Mudede (1949– ), writer, filmmaker, and leftwing cultural critic
 George Mujajati (1957– ), playwright and novelist
 Charles Mungoshi (1947–2019), writer and editor
 David Mungoshi (1949–2020), novelist and poet
 Masimba Musodza (1976– ), screenwriter, novelist, producer
 Solomon Mutswairo (1924–2005), novelist and poet (see also Zambia)
 Togara Muzanenhamo (1975– ), poet
 Geoffrey Ndhlala (1949– )
 Emmanuel Ngara (1947– ), academic
 Mthandazo Ndema Ngwenya (1949–1992), novelist, radio playwright and poet
 Stanley Nyamfukudza (1951– ), novelist and short story writer
 Freedom Nyamubaya (1958–2015), poet
 Emmanuel F. Ribeiro (1935– ), novelist
 Kristina Rungano (1963– ), first published woman poet in Zimbabwe
 Joe Ruzvidzo (1979– ), journalist and short story writer 
 Stanlake Samkange (1922–1988), historian and novelist 
 Amos M. P. Sibanda (1927– ), novelist
 Ndabezinhle S. Sigogo (1932–2006), novelist and editor 
 Ndabaningi Sithole (1922–2000), historian, politician, and novelist 
 Alexander McCall Smith (1948– ), also connected with Botswana, lawyer and novelist
 Valerie Tagwira
 T. K. Tsodzo / Thompson K. Tsodzo (1947– ), novelist
 Lawrence Vambe (1917–2019)
 Yvonne Vera, also connected with Canada (1964–2005), novelist, short story writer and editor
 Andrew Whaley (1958– )
 Paul Tiyambe Zeleza (1955– ), historian, critic, novelist and short story writer
 Musaemura Zimunya (1949– ), poet, critic and short story writer

See also 
 Zimbabwean literature

References

External links
 Zimbabwe at Poetry International Web.
 Authors at Reading Zimbabwe

Zimbabwean
Writers